The 2017 Lesbos earthquake occurred at 12:28:39 UTC on 12 June. The earthquake's epicentre was 5 km south of Plomari on the Greek island of Lesbos off the Aegean coast of Turkey. It had a magnitude of 6.3 on the moment magnitude scale and a maximum perceived intensity of IX (Violent) on the Mercalli intensity scale. Extensive damage was caused on parts of southern Lesbos, where there was one fatality and 10 people were injured. The earthquake was also felt in Turkey but no significant damage or injuries were reported.

Scientific Data on the 2017 Lesbos earthquake, collected by the Faculty of Geology and Geoenvironment of  National and Kapodistrian University of Athens are published on-line in an integrated Story Map

References

External links

2017 earthquakes
2017 in Greece
Earthquakes in Greece
June 2017 events in Europe
Lesbos